John Mitchell Allan (2 August 1888 – 4 September 1937) was an Australian rules footballer who played with Essendon in the Victorian Football League (VFL).

Notes

External links 
		

1888 births
1937 deaths
Australian rules footballers from Victoria (Australia)
Essendon Football Club players
Australian military personnel of World War I
Australian rules footballers from Albury